Kahun Khola (Nepali : काहु खोला) is a tributary of Bijayapur Khola in Pokhara.

References 

Rivers of Gandaki Province